First Rakovsky Government was a government led by Christian Rakovsky who replaced the former Soviet provisional government in Ukraine that came into crisis.

History
The Bolshevik insurgent Milrevkom was liquidated with establishment of the Provisional Workers-Peasants Government of Ukraine on November 28, 1918. The Council of People's Commissars was created on January 29, 1919 after Yuri Pyatakov was unable to find compromise with members of his government (Provisional Workers-Peasants Government of Ukraine). There was a political struggle between Pyatakov and Fyodor Sergeyev. To solve the issue to Ukraine was sent Christian Rakovsky who was appointed the new head of the Soviet government of Ukraine.

The initial composition of the council was based on the previous temporary government and consisted of 13 commissariats, the Council of National Economy, and the Supreme Socialist Inspection. Among its members were Antonov-Ovsiyenko, Bubnov, Voroshylov, Zharko, Zatonsky, Kotsyubynsky, Kviring, Magidov, Mezhlauk, Podvoisky, Rukhymovich, Sergeyev, Shlikhter, and others. The legal basis of the Council of People's Commissars was approved by the Third All-Ukrainian Congress of Soviets on March 10, 1919. The congress also approved the first Soviet Constitution of Ukraine.

List of people

References

Ukrainian governments
1919 establishments in Ukraine
1919 disestablishments in Ukraine
Cabinets established in 1919
Cabinets disestablished in 1919
Ukraine in the Russian Civil War